La Grande Odyssée Savoie Mont Blanc is an international sled dog race spanning  in French Alps and Swiss Alps. It was first held in January 2005. The 2012 La Grande Odyssée purse was $100,000. The next edition of the race was scheduled to be held from 10 to 21 January 2015.

The course
 

La Grande Odyssée Savoie-Mont-Blanc is intended for mushers with teams of 14 dogs who are experienced in long- and middle-distance.
The course takes the teams to 24 ski resorts (20 French and four Swiss). For each of the 10 stages, time-trialed (every two minutes) or mass (in parallel) starts bring thousands of spectators to the Savoie-Mont-Blanc region. The race includes three completely independent encampments: one in the first week and two in the second week.

The Haute-Maurienne-Vanoise Trophy
During the 2013 race, the Haute-Maurienne-Vanoise Trophy will take place during stages 7 (shortened), 8 and 9 of La Grande Odyssée Savoie-Mont-Blanc in Haute-Maurienne-Vanoise. It is open to a maximum of 10 middle-distance mushers, who must cover nearly 200 km/effort and climb up 5000m of height difference in total.
The Haute-Maurienne-Vanoise Trophy also includes a compulsory encampment on open mountain.

Technology
Using a GPS tracking system, spectators can visit the race's website to follow in real time the mushers' progress. The tracking also provides security for the competitors.
In addition to the tracking system, Each sled is also equipped with a calculator and a GPRS phone.

Each itinerary is simulated in 3D as a "virtual walk around" realized with the help of a camera positioned to follow a precise path along a track or sled trail.

List of winners 
The 2012 La Grande Odyssée purse was $100,000, the first prize was $30,000, the second prize was $20,000 and the third prize was $10,000.

2011 changes
For 2011, Finnmarksløpet in Norway and La Grande Odyssée Savoie Mont Blanc in France decided to create a new championship called the Arctic Alps Cup.  It follows the trails of the Espace Diamant that join the Franco-Swiss massifs called Portes du Soleil, the Haute Maurienne Vanoise and Megève.

See also 
Iditarod (Alaska)
Yukon Quest (From Alaska to Yukon)
Finnmarksløpet (Norway)
American Dog Derby (Idaho, USA)

References

External links 
La Grande Odyssée, Sled Dog Race Official site. (EN)

Dog sledding races
Recurring sporting events established in 2005
Sports competitions in France